Congorhynchus (Greek for "Congo snout") is a genus of prehistoric ray-finned fish that was described by E. Darteville and E. Casier in 1949.

Fossils belonging to Congorhynchus date back to the Maastrichtian stage of the Late Cretaceous as well as the Eocene. This means that this genus survived the Cretaceous–Paleogene extinction event that killed the dinosaurs. There are three known species, all of which are extinct.

References

 

Acanthomorpha
Cretaceous bony fish
Paleocene fish
Eocene fish
Prehistoric ray-finned fish genera